is an original video animation based on a novel series by Kiyoshi Kasai and published by Kadokawa Shoten, produced by Toei Animation and directed by Kazuhisa Takenouchi. It was broadcast in United States on May 5, 2008 and in Canada by Super Channel on December 1, 2008. The OVA is licensed in the US and United Kingdom by Manga Entertainment. Manga Entertainment released a DVD of the Vampire Wars OVA on June 25, 2002. The first volume was published in 1982 and the series overall spanned up to 11 novels. Artwork in the original printing was handled by Hiroyuki Kitazume, while the reprint was made by Takashi Takeuchi.



Cast

References

External links 

 

1991 anime OVAs
Toei Animation original video animation